Paul Andrew Schneider (born March 16, 1976) is an American actor. He is best known for his portrayal of Mark Brendanawicz on the first two seasons of the NBC sitcom Parks and Recreation and Dick Liddil in The Assassination of Jesse James by the Coward Robert Ford. He won a Best Actor in a Narrative Feature award at the 2014 Tribeca Film Festival for his performance in Goodbye to All That and the Best Supporting Actor Award from the National Society of Film Critics for his performance as Charles Armitage Brown in Bright Star.

Early life
Schneider was born in Oakland, California, and raised in Asheville, North Carolina. He graduated from the University of North Carolina School of the Arts.

Career
In 2000, Schneider made his film debut in David Gordon Green's George Washington and starred in Green's All the Real Girls. As research for his role as Jesse Baylor in Elizabethtown, director Cameron Crowe suggested that Schneider tour with the band My Morning Jacket for five days. Schneider accompanied the band to concerts held in such locations as Irving Plaza, the Webster Theater, the Theater of the Living Arts, and Stone Pony Landing.

After Elizabethtown, Schneider had supporting roles in The Family Stone and Live Free or Die. In 2007, he portrayed Gus Lindstrom in Lars and the Real Girl and Dick Liddil in The Assassination of Jesse James by the Coward Robert Ford. He was named one of "Ten Actors to Watch" by Variety. In 2008, he made his directorial debut with the independent film Pretty Bird. Also in 2008, Schneider played President William Henry Harrison in an episode of the Comedy Central series Drunk History Vol. 4.

In 2009, Schneider appeared as Charles Armitage Brown in Bright Star, for which he won the Best Supporting Actor Award from the National Society of Film Critics. The award was shared with Christoph Waltz for Inglourious Basterds. He portrayed Courtney Farlander in Away We Go.

In arguably his most mainstream role, Schneider co-starred as Mark Brendanawicz in the NBC series Parks and Recreation, appearing in the first 2 seasons from 2009 to 2010 before leaving the series.

In 2018, Schneider made his Broadway debut in Young Jean Lee's play Straight White Men as Matt. Schneider's performance earned praise, with The New York Times critic Jesse Green singling him out as one of the highlights of the production.

Personal life 
On April 16, 2016, Schneider married Theresa Avila, an occupational therapist and co-founder of The World Lens Foundation, of which Schneider is a board member. The two have a daughter. Schneider is an Innocence Project Ambassador.

Filmography

Film

Television

Awards and nominations

References

External links

 Paul Schneider Biography - Yahoo! Movies

1976 births
20th-century American male actors
21st-century American male actors
American male film actors
Living people
People from Asheville, North Carolina
Male actors from North Carolina
University of North Carolina School of the Arts alumni
American male television actors